Warrenbayne is a locality in north-eastern Victoria, Australia.

Warrenbayne was home to a state primary school, Warrenbayne Primary School, until its closure in 2008 due to declining enrolments.

References

Further reading

External links

Towns in Victoria (Australia)
Rural City of Benalla